is a passenger railway station located in the city of Niihama, Ehime Prefecture, Japan. It is operated by JR Shikoku and has the station number "Y30".

Lines
Nakahagi Station is served by the JR Shikoku Yosan Line and is located 107.9 km from the beginning of the line at Takamatsu. Yosan line local, Rapid Sunport, and Nanpū Relay services stop at the station.

Layout
The station, which is unstaffed, consists of two opposed side platforms serving two tracks. The station building is unstaffed and serves only as a waiting room. Access to the opposite side platform is by means of a footbridge. A siding branches off line 1 and leads to a disused freight platform.

Adjacent stations

History
Nakahagi Station opened on 21 September 1921 on the then Sanuki Line. At that time the station was operated by Japanese Government Railways, later becoming Japanese National Railways (JNR). With the privatization of JNR on 1 April 1987, control of the station passed to JR Shikoku.

Surrounding area
There is a small station square in front of the station, and a road leading to Japan National Route 11 extends south from there. The area around the station is a residential area, but there are no shops in front of the station,

See also
 List of railway stations in Japan

References

External links
[https://www.jr-shikoku.co.jp/01_trainbus/jikoku/pdf/nakahagi.pdf Station timetable

Railway stations in Ehime Prefecture
Railway stations in Japan opened in 1921
Niihama, Ehime